Ascobolus immersus is a species of fungi belonging to the family Ascobolaceae.

It has cosmopolitan distribution. It is known to be coprophilous, growing on the dung of geese, sheep and cattle.

References

Pezizales